Blasticorhinus ussuriensis is a moth of the family Erebidae first described by Otto Vasilievich Bremer in 1861. It is found in Taiwan, Korea, Japan and the Russian Far East.

The wingspan is 54–58 mm.

The larvae feed on various woody Leguminosae, including Lespedeza, Millettia, Robinia and Wisteria species. There is also a record for Quercus. They are slender and longitudinally banded in various shades of greyish brown.

References

Moths described in 1861
Calpinae
Moths of Japan